The Cardigans are a band from Sweden. They have released six studio albums, which in total have sold about 15 million copies worldwide. This is a list of their album and single releases.

Studio albums

Compilation albums

Singles

Videography

Video albums

Music videos

Other appearances 
"Lovefool" on William Shakespeare's Romeo + Juliet: Music from the Motion Picture (1996)
"Carnival" on Original Soundtrack: Austin Powers: International Man of Mystery (1997)
"It's War" on A Life Less Ordinary Soundtrack (1997)
"Deuce" on The X-Files: The Album (1998)
"War" on 10 Things I Hate About You: Music from the Motion Picture (1999)

Notes
A  Long Gone Before Daylight did not enter the Billboard 200, but peaked at number 37 on Billboards Independent Albums chart.
C  The original Emmerdale version of "Rise and Shine" was only released in Sweden. It was later re-recorded for international editions of Life. This new version was re-issued as a single in Sweden, Japan and the UK in 1995 and throughout Europe in 1996.
D  "Black Letter Day" was only released in Sweden.
E  "Hey! Get Out of My Way" was only released in Sweden and Japan. In the UK, "Sick and Tired" was re-issued in its place, with the same B-sides.

References

Cardigans, The